Haplogroup E-M329, also known as E1b1a2, is a human Y-chromosome DNA haplogroup. E-M329 is mostly found in East Africa.

Origin

Trombetta et al. (2011) suggested an origin in East Africa:

The new topology here reported has important implications as to the origins of the haplogroup E-P2. Using the principle of the phylogeographic parsimony, the resolution of the E-M215 trifurcation in favor of a common ancestor of E-M2 and E-M329 strongly supports the hypothesis that haplogroup E-P2 originated in eastern Africa, as previously suggested, and that chromosomes E-M2, so frequently observed in sub-Saharan Africa, trace their descent to a common ancestor present in eastern Africa.

Distribution

E-M329 is mostly found in East Africa. E-M329 is frequent in Southwestern Ethiopia, especially among Omotic-speaking populations. Semino et al. (2004) found 2 cases of E-M329 in Ethiopian Oromo, out of 2400 individuals, including 78 Oromo. Cadenas et al. (2007) found one case of E-M329, out of 72 people, in Qatar.

Subclades

E-V2403

E-V2403 is a subclade of haplogroup E-M329.

E-M329*

E-M329* is a subclade of haplogroup E-M329.

Phylogenetics

Phylogenetic history

Prior to 2002, there were in academic literature at least seven naming systems for the Y-Chromosome Phylogenetic tree. This led to considerable confusion. In 2002, the major research groups came together and formed the Y-Chromosome Consortium (YCC). They published a joint paper that created a single new tree that all agreed to use. Later, a group of citizen scientists with an interest in population genetics and genetic genealogy formed a working group to create an amateur tree aiming at being above all timely.  The table below brings together all of these works at the point of the landmark 2002 YCC Tree. This allows a researcher reviewing older published literature to quickly move between nomenclatures.

Research publications

The following research teams per their publications were represented in the creation of the YCC tree.

Phylogenetic trees

This phylogenetic tree of haplogroup  subclades is based on the Y-Chromosome Consortium (YCC) 2008 Tree, the ISOGG Y-DNA Haplogroup E Tree, and subsequent published research.

 E1b1a (L222.1, V38, V100)
 E1b1a1 (DYS271/M2/SY81, M291, P1/PN1, P189, P293, V43, V95, Z1101, Z1107, Z1116, Z1120, Z1122, Z1123, Z1124, Z1125, Z1127, Z1130, Z1133)
 E1b1a2 (M329)

See also

Genetics

Y-DNA E subclades

Y-DNA backbone tree

Notes

References

Sources for conversion tables

 
 

 
 
 
 
 

Human Y-DNA haplogroups